Barbara Brannon is a retired major general in the United States Air Force who served as head of the Air Force Nurse Corps.

Brannon has a BS in nursing from San Francisco State University and an MS in nursing from the University of California, San Francisco. Brannon joined the Air Force as a nurse in 1975.

Sources
 Air Force biography of Brannon

Year of birth missing (living people)
Living people
American women nurses
San Francisco State University alumni
University of California, San Francisco alumni
United States Air Force generals
United States Air Force Nurse Corps officers
21st-century American women